James Rae Bauchop (22 May 1886 in Sauchie – 13 June 1948 Bradford) was a professional footballer who played as a forward for Alloa Athletic, Celtic, Norwich City, Crystal Palace, Derby County, Tottenham Hotspur, Bradford Park Avenue, Doncaster Rovers and Lincoln City.

Football career 
Bauchop began his career at Alloa Athletic before playing for Glasgow Celtic where he was member of the club's Championship winning sides of 1905–06 and 1906–07. 

Bauchop later played for Norwich City before moving to Crystal Palace early in 1908. He made his debut on 21 March in the home derby against Millwall, scoring the second in a 2-0 victory. He would make 47 appearances for the club in both the Southern League and the FA Cup, scoring 26 goals. He scored one hat-trick for the club, in a home game against Portsmouth on 24 October 1908. He also became the first Palace player to be sent off, in a London Challenge Cup tie against Croydon Common on 9 September 1908.

In 1909 he joined Derby County where he featured in 126 matches and scoring 68 goals between 1909–12. 

Bauchop signed for Tottenham Hotspur in 1913. He scored twice on his Lilywhites debut in a 4-1 victory over Sheffield United at Bramall Lane in September 1913 in the old First Division. Jimmy played in 10 matches and found the net on six occasions for the Spurs.

In 1913 he moved on to Bradford Park Avenue and participated in 157 games and found the net 67 times. 

Bauchop went on to play for Doncaster Rovers where he scored 3 League and FA Cup goals. His debut was in the first game at Rovers' new ground Low Pastures, which was to become known as Belle Vue, in front of what was then Doncaster's highest ever home crowd of around 10,000.

He then ended his career at Lincoln City where he played a further 28 games, scoring 11 goals.

Bauchop died on 13 June 1948, in Bradford, England.

Honours 
Celtic
 Scottish Football League First Division: Winners 1905–06, 1906–07

References

External links
Bauchop's Celtic FC stats

1886 births
1948 deaths
Sportspeople from Clackmannanshire
Scottish footballers
Scottish Football League players
English Football League players
Alloa Athletic F.C. players
Celtic F.C. players
Norwich City F.C. players
Crystal Palace F.C. players
Derby County F.C. players
Tottenham Hotspur F.C. players
Bradford (Park Avenue) A.F.C. players
Doncaster Rovers F.C. players
Lincoln City F.C. players
Association football forwards